Andrea Bolley (born 1949) is a Canadian abstract painter based in Toronto.

Work
Bolley's paintings are abstract canvases which take their inspiration from Colour Field painters such as Helen Frankenthaler, Clyfford Still and Jules Olitski. Her work has been praised for the complex treatment of surface and depth. Bolley has made distinctive use of paper, both as a tool for the application of paint and in her "paper paintings", which incorporate a paper collage element. Bolley participated in the Art Gallery of Ontario's Artists with their Work program in the 1970s, for which she presented art workshops throughout the province of Ontario. In the 1970s and 1980s, Bolley worked closely with the painter Tony Calzetta and the two artists' work was paired in a number of exhibitions.

Exhibitions
Bolley's first major exhibition was held at the Pollock Gallery in 1977, and received critical attention for the artist's seriousness and ability to establish her own expressive voice within the tradition of colour field painting. A retrospective exhibition of Bolley's work was held at the Agnes Etherington Art Centre in 1981. Solo exhibitions of her work have also been held at the Thames Art Gallery (2004), Gallery 132, Toronto (1994-2003), Gallery One (1984-1986), and the Pollock Gallery (1977-1980).

Collections
Bolley's work is in major public and private collections including the Art Gallery of Windsor, Canada Council Art Bank, Imperial Oil, Labatt's of Canada, and Toronto Dominion Bank.

References

External links
 www.andreabolley.com

1949 births
Living people
Artists from Ontario
Canadian contemporary artists
People from Guelph
20th-century Canadian women artists
20th-century Canadian artists
Canadian abstract artists